David Lambert (7 July 1939 – 2016) was a Welsh footballer who played as a left-back. He played in the English football league for Wrexham, and also played for Cardiff City, although made no appearances at the latter.

References

1939 births
2016 deaths
Welsh footballers
Association football defenders
Druids United F.C. players
Cardiff City F.C. players
Wrexham A.F.C. players
Oswestry Town F.C. players
English Football League players
People from Ruabon
Sportspeople from Wrexham County Borough